The Central Spine Road 2 or Malacca Strait Bridge (Indonesian: Jembatan Selat Malaka, Malaysian: Jambatan Selat Melaka or JSM and Jembatan Selmal) is a proposed bridge that would connect Teluk Gong, near Masjid Tanah, Malacca in Peninsular Malaysia to Rupat Island and Dumai in Sumatra island, Indonesia. The project has been submitted for government approval, and is expected to take 10 years to complete. Once completed, the  bridge will be the longest sea-crossing bridge in the world. The project will have two cable-stayed bridges and one suspension bridge, both the longest in the world.

The construction of a bridge of this kind would have numerous implications, including for the management of ship movements through the Malacca Straits, one of the busiest shipping channels in the world.

Timeline
 In March 2013 during a visit to China, Germany, Russia and Japan, president Susilo Bambang Yudhoyono of Indonesia said that the construction of the planned Sunda Strait Bridge would have priority.  He said that four years earlier he had turned down a request from Malaysia to support the construction of the Malacca Strait Bridge because the construction of such a bridge would facilitate the depletion of resources in Sumatra "by Asia".
 On 15 October 2013, the Malacca State Government revived the controversial  Malacca-Dumai, Indonesia, bridge project across the Straits of Malacca, after a seven-year lull.  The Exim Bank of China was reportedly prepared to fund up to 85% of the cost of the project (estimated at US$14 billion) with the rest of the financing being provided from regional sovereign funds and private investors.

See also
Singapore Strait crossing

References

Bridges in Malaysia
Bridges in Indonesia
Cable-stayed bridges in Indonesia
Proposed bridges in Malaysia
Proposed bridges in Indonesia
Toll bridges in Malaysia